Midnight Fire is the second studio album by American country music artist Steve Wariner. It was released in 1983 by RCA Nashville. The album produced five singles on the Billboard Hot Country Singles chart including two top ten singles: "Don't Your Memory Ever Sleep at Night" at number 23, "Midnight Fire" at number 5, "Lonely Women Make Good Lovers" (a cover of a 1972 Bob Luman hit) at number 4, "Why Goodbye" at number 12, and "Don't You Give Up on Love" at number 49.

Content
"Overnight Sensation" is a cover of the Mickey Gilley song from 1975, with Barbara Mandrell on duet vocals. This same recording also appears on Mandrell's 1983 album Spun Gold.

The album was produced by Tony Brown and Norro Wilson, except for the last two tracks, which were produced by Tom Collins instead.

Critical reception
Giving it 4.5 out of 5 stars, Joy Lynn Stewart of the Red Deer Advocate said that the album had "fine, textured vocals". She felt that Wariner's singing was as strong on the uptempo material as it was on the ballads, and felt that Wariner's style was "old-fashioned country...blended with a newer sound."

Track listing

Chart performance

Album

References

Steve Wariner albums
1983 albums
RCA Records albums
Albums produced by Tony Brown (record producer)
Albums produced by Norro Wilson